David Havíř (born April 18, 1975) is a Czech former professional ice hockey defenceman. 

He played 726 games in the Czech Extraliga with HC Kometa Brno, HC Znojemští Orli, HC Pardubice, HC Karlovy Vary, HC Plzeň and HC Bílí Tygři Liberec.

References

External links

1975 births
Living people
HC Bílí Tygři Liberec players
Czech ice hockey defencemen
HC Dynamo Pardubice players
SHK Hodonín players
HC Karlovy Vary players
HC Kometa Brno players
Orli Znojmo players
Piráti Chomutov players
HC Plzeň players
HC ZUBR Přerov players
Ice hockey people from Brno
Viry-Châtillon EH players
Czech expatriate ice hockey people
Expatriate ice hockey players in France
Czech expatriate sportspeople in France